Planopus is a genus of beetles in the family Cerambycidae, containing the following species:

 Planopus laniniensis Bosq, 1953
 Planopus octaviusbarrosi Cerda, 1968

References

Necydalinae